Christian Schmidt (born 14 February 1980 in Frankfurt (Oder)), known as Klopfer, is a German writer and editor.

Biography 
Schmidt was born in 1980 to a teacher and a technician. Growing up in the German Democratic Republic, he was a Young Pioneer. He adopted the name Klopfer (English: Thumper) after the Bambi character, as both Christian and Schmidt are among the most common names in Germany. Since 2016, his pseudonym is officially recognised.

After completing his Abitur in 1999, Schmidt studied computer science at the University of Potsdam from 1999 until 2004. At the Humboldt University of Berlin, he studied Japanese studies from 2004 until 2005 and German studies from 2005 until 2010.

From 2000 until 2016, Schmidt maintained the Manga and Anime online database Animestreet. In 1999, he opened a personal website which he named Klopfers Web in 2002. Among other texts, he writes columns for Klopfers Web, and has released two volumes of collected columns in printed form. For his high degree of communication with his readers through his website, he has been described as an "Author 2.0".

Since 2002, Schmidt works for the manga publishers Egmont Manga & Anime and Tokyopop.

Selected work

Authored

Edited

References

External links 

Klopfers Web
Animestreet (archived; offline for maintenance since 2016)

Living people
1980 births
People from Frankfurt (Oder)
German editors
21st-century German male writers